The Scissors Crisis is the name for an incident in early 1923 Soviet history during the New Economic Policy (NEP), when there was a widening gap ("price scissors") between industrial and agricultural prices. The term is now used to describe this economic circumstance in many periods of history.

Like the blades of a pair of open scissors, the prices of industrial and agricultural goods diverged, reaching a peak in October 1923 where industrial prices were 276 percent of their 1913 levels, while agricultural prices were only 89 percent. The name was coined by Leon Trotsky after the scissors-shaped price/time graph. This meant that peasants' incomes fell, and it became difficult for them to buy manufactured goods.  As a result, peasants began to stop selling their produce and revert to subsistence farming, leading to fears of a famine.

Causes
A similar crisis had occurred in 1916, when for example the price of rye rose by 47% whereas that of a pair of boots rose by 334%.
The crisis happened because agricultural production had rebounded quickly from the famine of 1921–22 and the civil war. In contrast, industry took longer to recover, due to the need to rebuild infrastructure. Furthermore, the problem was exacerbated by the government seeking to avoid another famine by keeping the bread grain prices at artificially low levels.

Actions
By August 1923 a wave of strikes spread across Russian industrial centres, sparked off by the crisis. Within the Communist Party, The Declaration of 46 was produced as a signed protest sent to the Central Committee of the RCP. To combat the crisis, the government reduced costs of industrial production by cutting staff, rationalizing production, controlling wages and benefits and reducing the influence of traders and middlemen (NEPmen) by expanding the network of consumer cooperatives (such as the People's Commissariat of Trade).

As a result of these actions, the imbalance started to decrease. By April 1924, the agricultural price index had reached 92 (compared to its 1913 level) and the industrial index had fallen to 131.

The scissors crisis caused many problems in the long term for the NEP causing tensions seen pre-1917 revolution.

See also
 Ural-Siberian method
 Industrialization in the Soviet Union
 Collectivization in the Soviet Union
 Price scissors

References

External links
 1924: Scissors Crisis - "Smychka and the Scissors Crisis", at Seventeen Moments in Soviet History, an essay by Lewis Siegelbaum

1923 in the Soviet Union
Economic history of the Soviet Union
Marxian economics